Anirudh "Ajay" Agarwal (born 20 December 1949) is a retired Indian actor. He is known for his appearances in horror films such as Purana Mandir, Bandh Darwaza, and Saamri as well as starring in episodes of Zee Horror Show.

Early life
During his school and college years, Agarwal was the sports ambassador. He studied Civil Engineering at the Indian Institute of Technology Roorkee, before graduating in 1974. He moved to Mumbai, where he initially started work as an engineer but quit his job to begin his acting career.

Career

Due to his somewhat intimidating appearance, caused by a tumor near his pituitary gland, Agarwal starred in Hindi films and television as demonic/ghostly characters or villains in general. He most notably worked with the Ramsay brothers, first starring in their film Purana Mandir as Samri, then as the vampire Nevla in Bandh Darwaza and once again as Samri in Saamri. He also featured in two Hollywood films; playing a supporting antagonist in Stephen Sommers' 1994 live action adaptation of The Jungle Book and later briefly appearing in Such a Long Journey.

And in 1994, when he was approached by Shekhar Kapur for the role of Babu Gujjar in Bandit Queen, it was a defining moment as he got the right opportunity to demonstrate his versatility as an artist. He later joined hands with his friends Aamir Khan for Mela in 2000 and with Akshay Kumar for Talash: The Hunt Begins in 2003.

Following a cameo in Mallika in 2010, Agarwal retired from acting due to film roles becoming scarce.

Filmography

Bollywood Films

Hollywood
The Jungle Book (1994) - Tabaqui
Such a Long Journey (1998)

Television
 Zee Horror Show (1993)
 Tu Tu Main Main (1994)
 Mano Ya Na Mano (1995)
 Shaktimaan (1997)
Hudd Kar Di (1999)

References

External links
 
 

Indian male film actors
Male actors in Hindi cinema
Indian male television actors
1949 births
Living people
21st-century Indian male actors